Lianne Sobey is a Canadian curler from New Brunswick. She plays lead for Andrea Kelly.

She won the 2005 Canadian Junior Curling Championships with Kelly, and then a bronze medal at the 2005 World Junior Curling Championships. Sobey won the 2009 New Brunswick Scotties Tournament of Hearts with Kelly.

References 

Curlers from New Brunswick
Living people
Year of birth missing (living people)